Sudan Interior Church  is a Baptist Christian denomination, affiliated with the Baptist World Alliance, in Sudan. The headquarters is in Khartoum. The general secretary is Ramadan Chan.

History
Sudan Interior Church has its origins in Sudan Interior Mission, an american mission of Society for International Ministries (now Serving In Mission) in 1936.  Sudan Interior Church is founded in 1963.  In 2014, it had 120 churches and 25,000 members.  According to a denomination census released in 2020, it claimed 300 churches and 35,000 members.

See also
World Evangelical Alliance
Believers' Church
Worship service (evangelicalism)

References

Baptist denominations in Africa
Churches in Sudan